The 2001 Miller Lite Hall of Fame Championships was a men's tennis tournament played on grass courts at the International Tennis Hall of Fame in Newport, Rhode Island in the United States and was part of the International Series of the 2001 ATP Tour. It was the 26th edition of the tournament and ran from July 9 through July 15, 2001.

Finals

Singles

 Neville Godwin defeated  Martin Lee 6–1, 6–4
 It was Godwin's only title of the year and the 1st of his career.

Doubles

 Bob Bryan /  Mike Bryan defeated  André Sá /  Glenn Weiner 6–3, 7–5
 It was Bob Bryan's 3rd title of the year and the 3rd of his career. It was Mike Bryan's 3rd title of the year and the 3rd of his career.

References

External links
 Official website
 ATP tournament profile
 ITF tournament edition details

Miller Lite Hall of Fame Championships
Hall of Fame Open
Miller Lite Hall of Fame Championships
Tennis tournaments in Rhode Island
Miller Lite Hall of Fame Championships
 
Miller Lite Hall of Fame Championships